is a river in Fukushima Prefecture, Tochigi Prefecture and Ibaraki Prefecture, Japan. It rises at the northern slope of Mount Yamizo, where the border of these three prefectures is located, and flows into Pacific Ocean at Hitachi and Tokai in Ibaraki Prefecture.

The name of Kuji is thought to have been named after whale (kujira in Japanese). , one of the existent Fudoki, says, "There were a hill that resembled a whale (kujira). Then the emperor named the land Kuji."  The river is known for ayu fishing, and in 2006 it had the second largest catch of ayu in Japan after Naka River, which is also located in Ibaraki Prefecture. The fishing weir (梁 yana) for tourists is installed along the river in Daigo. Famous Fukuroda Falls are located on Taki River (滝川 Takigawa), which is one of its tributary rivers. On midwinter a phenomenon called  can be observed in the river. Shiga is a phenomenon in which frazil ice that is generated at the bottom floats on the surface.  Distribution of freshwater fish like salvelinus and masu salmon captured in Fukushima Prefecture had been restricted after Fukushima Daiichi nuclear disaster, though in Kuji River the restriction was gradually removed.

Geography 

Kuji River originates from the northern slope of Mount Yamizo, where the border of Fukushima Prefecture, Tochigi Prefecture and Ibaraki Prefecture is located. It initially flows to the northeast in Tanagura, Fukushima and then changes the flow direction to the sounth in the town. The dividing ridges of Abukuma River and Kuji River are relatively low, and it is considered that Kuji River captured the course of Abukuma River in the past. In Ibaraki Prefecture it flows through Daigo, Hitachiomiya and flows finally into Pacific Ocean at the border of Hitachi and Tokai. While the mainstream of the river flows through Fukushima Prefecture and Ibaraki Prefecture, some tributaries flow through Otawara in Tochigi Prefecture (former Kurobane), which is located in the southwest of Mt.Yamizo.

The approximately 80% of the basin consists of mountains and hills, and the rest consists of plateaus and plains. In the downstream basin there is Naka Plateau (那珂台地) between Naka River and Kuji River, which is a fluvial terrace formed by the erosion and deposition by the two rivers.

Major tributaries 

  (八溝川)
Yamizo River originates from the southern slope of Mt. Yamizo in Daigo, Ibaraki. It is 20.8 kilometers long. The natural springs of Yamizo River (八溝川湧水群 Yamizogawa Yūsuigun) are located at the source of the river.
 Oshi River (押川)
It is 27.4 kilometers in length and flows into Kuji River.
 Taki River (滝川)
Taki River rises at Namase Basin (生瀬盆地) and flows to the west. It is 12 kilometers in length. Namase Falls and Fukuroda Falls are located alongside the river. Fukuroda Falls are one of the three great waterfalls of Japan (日本三名瀑 Nihon-san-meibaku), the other two being Kegon Falls and Nachi Falls. Namase Falls and Fukuroda falls are designated as Places of Scenic Beauty.
 Tama River (玉川)
It is 20.0 kilometers in length and flows into Kuji River.
 Asa River (浅川)
It is 23.9 kilometers in length and flows into Kuji River.
 Yamada River (山田川)
It originates from Mount Nabeashi (鍋足山), flows through former Suifu, Kanasagō, Hitachiota, and into Kuji River. It is 37.8 kilometers in length.
 Ryūjin River (竜神川)
It is 12.5 kilometers in length and flows into Yamada River at Takakura (高倉) in former Suifu Village. , a valley that was formed by the erosion, is situated alongside the river. Ryujin Big Suspension Bridge (竜神大吊橋 Ryujin Otsuribashi) links both sides of the valley, and is the longest suspension bridge for pedestrians in Honshu at 375 meters.
 Sato River (里川) 
It is 51.4 kilometers in length and flows into Kuji River.

Municipalities in the basin 
In the basin there are five cities, five towns and two villages, which are listed below.  the population of the basin is approximately 200,000.

 Hitachi, Hitachiota, Naka, Hitachiomiya, Daigo, Tokai (in Ibaraki Pref.)
 Asakawa, Tanagura, Hanawa, Yamatsuri, Samegawa (in Fukushima Pref.)
 Otawara (in Tochigi Pref.)

Notes

References

Further reading 
  (in Japanese)

External links 
 Hitachi River and National Highway Office (in Japanese)
 Rivers Division of Ibaraki Prefectural Government (in Japanese)
 Kujigawa Fishery Cooperative (in Japanese)

Rivers of Fukushima Prefecture
Rivers of Ibaraki Prefecture
Rivers of Japan